Cononley railway station serves the village of Cononley in North Yorkshire, England. The station, and all trains serving it, are operated by Northern.

It was originally opened in late 1847, at a cost of £900, by the Leeds and Bradford Extension Railway. It was closed on 22 March 1965, though its platforms remained intact and the main buildings survived until the mid-1970s.

It was reopened by British Rail on 20 April 1988 at a cost of £34,000, which was borne by the county, district and local parish councils and the Rural Development Commission.

The station has two platforms and is right beside Cononley's main street. Step-free access is available to both platforms, via the level crossing at the Skipton end of the station. It is unstaffed but has now been fitted with ticket machines (one on the southbound platform and the other on the northbound side adjacent to the exit) to allow passengers to buy before travelling.  An automated Tannoy system and digital information screens provide train running information to passengers.

Services
During Monday to Saturday daytime, there is a half-hourly service from Skipton to Leeds and hourly to Bradford Forster Square and three trains an hour towards Skipton.  The Bradford service was reduced from every 30 minutes to hourly at the spring 2022 timetable change.  

On Sundays is an hourly service to Leeds and Bradford with two trains per hour to Skipton.

These services are normally provided by Class 333 or Class 331 sets.

Services towards Morecambe and Carlisle normally pass through without stopping, but the first morning service to Carlisle and the last evening train from Ribblehead to Leeds each serve the station. One train to both Morecambe and Carlisle stop here on Sunday mornings.

Notes

References

External links

Railway stations in North Yorkshire
DfT Category F1 stations
Craven District
Former Midland Railway stations
Railway stations in Great Britain opened in 1847
Railway stations in Great Britain closed in 1965
Railway stations in Great Britain opened in 1988
Reopened railway stations in Great Britain
Northern franchise railway stations
Beeching closures in England
1847 establishments in England